V35, or similar, may refer to:
 Beechcraft Bonanza V35
 Fokker V.35, a German prototype World War I fighter aircraft
 LG V35 ThinQ smartphone
 Nissan Skyline V35, an automobile
 V.35, a telecommunications recommendation of the ITU-T